The Saturn IB (also known as the uprated Saturn I) was an American launch vehicle commissioned by the National Aeronautics and Space Administration (NASA) for the Apollo program. It uprated the Saturn I by replacing the S-IV second stage (43,380,000 lb-sec total impulse), with the S-IVB (96,000,000 lb-sec total impulse).

By sharing the S-IVB upper stage, the Saturn IB and Saturn V provided a common interface to the Apollo spacecraft. The only major difference was that the S-IVB on the Saturn V burned only part of its propellant to achieve Earth orbit, so it could be restarted for trans-lunar injection. The S-IVB on the Saturn IB needed all of its propellant to achieve Earth orbit.

The Saturn IB launched two uncrewed CSM suborbital flights to a height of 162 km, one uncrewed LM orbital flight, and the first crewed CSM orbital mission (first planned as Apollo 1, later flown as Apollo 7). It also launched one orbital mission, AS-203, without a payload so the S-IVB would have residual liquid hydrogen fuel. This mission supported the design of the restartable version of the S-IVB used in the Saturn V, by observing the behavior of the liquid hydrogen in weightlessness.

In 1973, the year after the Apollo lunar program ended, three Apollo CSM/Saturn IBs ferried crews to the Skylab space station. In 1975, one last Apollo/Saturn IB launched the Apollo portion of the joint US-USSR Apollo–Soyuz Test Project (ASTP). A backup Apollo CSM/Saturn IB was assembled and made ready for a Skylab rescue mission, but never flown.

The remaining Saturn IBs in NASA's inventory were scrapped after the ASTP mission, as no use could be found for them and all heavy lift needs of the US space program could be serviced by the cheaper and more versatile Titan III family and also the Space Shuttle.

History
In 1959, NASA's Silverstein Committee issued recommendations to develop the Saturn class launch vehicles, growing from the C-1. When the Apollo program was started in 1961 with the goal of landing men on the Moon, NASA chose the Saturn I for Earth orbital test missions. In July 1962, NASA announced selection of the C-5 for the lunar landing mission, and decided to develop another launch vehicle by upgrading the Saturn I, replacing its S-IV second stage with the S-IVB, which would also be modified for use as the Saturn V third stage. The S-I first stage would also be upgraded to the S-IB by improving the thrust of its engines and removing some weight. The new Saturn IB, with a payload capability of at least , would replace the Saturn I for Earth orbit testing, allowing the command and service module to be flown with a partial fuel load. It would also allow launching the  lunar excursion module separately for uncrewed and crewed Earth orbital testing, before the Saturn V was ready to be flown. It would also give early development to the third stage.

On May 12, 1966, NASA announced the vehicle would be called the "uprated Saturn I", at the same time the "lunar excursion module" was renamed the lunar module. However, the "uprated Saturn I" terminology was reverted to Saturn IB on December 2, 1967.

Specifications

Launch vehicle

Payload configurations

S-IB stage

The S-IB stage was built by the Chrysler corporation at the Michoud Assembly Facility, New Orleans. It was powered by eight Rocketdyne H-1 rocket engines burning RP-1 fuel with liquid oxygen (LOX). Eight Redstone tanks (four holding fuel and four holding LOX) were clustered around a Jupiter rocket LOX tank, which earned the rocket the nickname "Cluster's Last Stand". The four outboard engines were mounted on gimbals, allowing them to be steered to control the rocket. Eight fins surrounding the base thrust structure provided aerodynamic stability and control.

Data from:

S-IVB-200 stage

The S-IVB was built by the Douglas Aircraft Company at Huntington Beach, California. The S-IVB-200 model was similar to the S-IVB-500 third stage used on the Saturn V, with the exception of the interstage adapter, smaller auxiliary propulsion control modules, and lack of on-orbit engine restart capability. It was powered by a single Rocketdyne J-2 engine. The fuel and oxidizer tanks shared a common bulkhead, which saved about ten tons of weight and reduced vehicle length over ten feet.

Instrument unit

IBM built the instrument unit at the Space Systems Center in Huntsville, Alabama. Located at the top of the S-IVB stage, it consisted of a Launch Vehicle Digital Computer (LVDC), an inertial platform, accelerometers, a tracking, telemetry and command system and associated environmental controls. It controlled the entire rocket from just before liftoff until battery depletion. Like other rocket guidance systems, it maintained its state vector (position and velocity estimates) by integrating accelerometer measurements, sent firing and steering commands to the main engines and auxiliary thrusters, and fired the appropriate ordnance and solid rocket motors during staging and payload separation events.

As with other rockets, a completely independent and redundant range safety system could be invoked by ground radio command to terminate thrust and to destroy the vehicle should it malfunction and threaten people or property on the ground. In the Saturn IB and V, the range safety system was permanently disabled by ground command after safely reaching orbit. This was done to ensure that the S-IVB stage would not inadvertently rupture and create a cloud of debris in orbit that could endanger the crew of the Apollo CSM.

Launch sequence events

Acceleration of the Saturn IB increased from 1.24G at liftoff to a maximum of 4.35G at the end of the S-IB stage burn, and increased again from 0G to 2.85G from stage separation to the end of the S-IVB burn.

AS-206, 207, and 208 inserted the Command and Service Module in a  elliptical orbit which was co-planar with the Skylab one.

Saturn IB vehicles and launches

The first five Saturn IB launches for the Apollo program were made from LC-34 and LC-37, Cape Kennedy Air Force Station.

The Saturn IB was used between 1973 and 1975 for three crewed Skylab flights, and one Apollo-Soyuz Test Project flight. This final production run did not have alternating black and white S-IB stage tanks, or vertical stripes on the S-IVB aft tank skirt, which were present on the earlier vehicles. Since LC-34 and 37 were inactive by then, these launches utilized Kennedy Space Center's LC-39B. Mobile Launcher Platform No. 1 was modified, adding an elevated platform known as the "milkstool" to accommodate the height differential between the Saturn IB and the much larger Saturn V. This enabled alignment of the Launch Umbilical Tower's access arms to accommodate crew access, fueling, and ground electrical connections for the Apollo spacecraft and S-IVB upper stage. The tower's second stage access arms were modified to service the S-IB first stage.

For earlier launches of vehicles in the Saturn I series, see the list in the Saturn I article.

Saturn IB rockets on display

As of 2019 there are three locations where Saturn IB vehicles (or parts thereof) are on display:
SA-209 is on display at the Kennedy Space Center Visitor Complex, with the Apollo Facilities Verification Vehicle. Due to severe corrosion, the first stage engines and service module were replaced with fabricated duplicates in 1993–1994.
The SA-211 first stage is on display with a mockup S-IVB stage stacked in a launch-ready condition at the Alabama Welcome Center on Interstate 65 in Ardmore, Alabama. 
The SA-211 S-IVB stage was mated with the Skylab underwater training docking adapter and Apollo Telescope Mount and is on display in the Rocket Garden of the U.S. Space & Rocket Center in Huntsville, Alabama.

Cost

See also
 Comparison of orbital launchers families
 Comparison of orbital launch systems

Notes

References

External links
 http://www.apollosaturn.com/
 http://www.spaceline.org/rocketsum/saturn-Ib.html
 NASA Marshall Spaceflight Center,  , 30 September 1972
  

1966 in spaceflight
1968 in spaceflight
1973 in spaceflight
1975 in spaceflight
Apollo program
Apollo 7
IB
Vehicles introduced in 1966